There is also a Romanian Orthodox Archbishop of Alba Iulia and a Greek Catholic Archdiocese of Făgăraş and Alba Iulia.
The Roman Catholic Archdiocese of Alba Iulia is a Latin Church Catholic archdiocese in Transylvania, Romania.

History 
It was established as a bishopric, the diocese of Transylvania also called Erdély (in Hungarian), or Karlsburg alias Siebenbürgen (in German), in 1009 by King Stephen I of Hungary and was renamed as the diocese of Alba Iulia on 22March 1932.
 
It was raised to the rank of an archdiocese by Pope John Paul II on 5August 1991. It is exempt, i.e. directly subordinate to the Vatican, while the other Romanian dioceses form the Ecclesiastical Province of Bucharest.

Bishops

Ordinaries
Bishops
Simon (1111–1113)
Peter (1134)
Baranus (1139)
Walter (1156–1157/8)
Vilcina (1166–1169)
Paul (1181)
Adrian (1192–1201)
William (1204–1221)
Raynald of Belleville (1222–1241)
Artolf (1244–1245)
Gallus (1246–1269)
Peter Monoszló (1270–1307)
Benedict (1309–1319)
Demetrius (1368–1376)
János Statileo (1534–1542)
Pál Bornemissza (1553–1556)
Demeter Naprágyi (1597–1605)
Ignác Batthyány (1780–1798)
Sándor Rudnay (1815–1819)
Lajos Haynald (1852–1863)
Áron Márton (1938–1980)
Lajos Bálint (1990–1991)

Archbishops
Lajos Bálint (1991–1993)
György Jakubinyi (1994–2019)
Gergely Kovács (since 2019)

Auxiliary Bishops
György-Miklós Jakubinyi (1990–1994), appointed Archbishop here
József Tamás (1996–2019)
László Kerekes (since 2020)

Description 
The archdiocese covers Transylvania proper—the counties of Alba, Bistrița-Năsăud, Brașov, Cluj, Covasna, Harghita, Hunedoara, Mureș, Sălaj and Sibiu.

The cathedral episcopal see is St. Michael's, in Alba Iulia city. It also has a minor basilica in Șumuleu Ciuc.

Population  
11% of the inhabitants are Roman Catholic, with concentrations in parts of Harghita and Covasna counties. Catholic adherents are predominantly ethnic Hungarians.

External links 

  Official site
 GigaCatholic, listing the episcopal incumbents

 
Roman Catholic dioceses in Romania
Religious organizations established in the 1000s